This route consists of a maze of trunk roads providing access to the locals of FELDA Aring. It is mostly known for providing access to Federal Route 185, linking Chiku of Malaysia Federal Route 8 to Kuala Jeneris, driving through spectacular sceneries from man-made Kenyir Lake.

Highways in Malaysia
1744